Goldney may refer to:

People
Francis Bennett-Goldney
Sir Gabriel Goldney, 1st Baronet
Sir Gabriel Goldney, 2nd Baronet
Sir Frederick Goldney, 3rd Baronet
Sir Henry Goldney, 4th Baronet
George Goldney (1816–1871), English clergyman and cricketer
George Hone-Goldney (1851–1921), English lawyer and cricketer, and son of the above 
John Goldney

Others
Goldney baronets
Goldney family
Goldney Hall
Goldney House
Goldney River
Goldney ball
Goldney gardens